Vogler Peak is a rock peak (2,050 m) 0.75 mile southwest of Mount Irvine on Roa Ridge in Asgard Range, Victoria Land. Named for Jane Vogler, National Science Foundation (NSF) program manager, who was NSF Science Representative at McMurdo and South Pole stations. Established the management plan for McMurdo's Albert P. Crary Science and Engineering Center (1985–86), and established the Foundation's Antarctic Environmental Research Program (1994).

Mountains of the Asgard Range
McMurdo Dry Valleys